Borovec may refer to: 

In Bulgaria:
Borovets, a mountain resort situated in the Province of Sofia

In Macedonia:
 , a village near Struga 

In Slovenia:
Borovec pri Kočevski Reki, a settlement in the Municipality of Kočevje
Borovec pri Karlovici, a settlement in the Municipality of Velike Lašče